Koşuyolu is a neighborhood in Kadıköy district of Istanbul, Turkey, on the Anatolian side.

Neighbourhoods of Kadıköy